

Gmina Komprachcice, German: Gemeinde Comprachtschütz is a rural gmina (administrative district) in Opole County, Opole Voivodeship, in south-western Poland.

Since 2009 the commune, like much of the area, has been bilingual in German and Polish, and a substantial German minority remained after the War.

Administrative divisions
The commune contains the villages and settlements of:

Komprachcice
Chmielowice
Domecko
Dziekaństwo
Ochodze
Osiny
Polska Nowa Wieś
Pucnik
Wawelno
Żerkowice

Neighbouring gminas
Gmina Komprachcice is bordered by the city of Opole and by the gminas of Dąbrowa, Prószków and Tułowice.

Twin towns – sister cities

Gmina Komprachcice is twinned with:
 Hasbergen, Germany
 Město Albrechtice, Czech Republic

References

Komprachcice
Opole County
Bilingual communes in Poland